Rodion Romanovich Raskolnikov the fictional protagonist of Dostoyevsky's novel Crime and Punishment.  

Raskolnikov may also refer to:

Things named after the character
Raskolnikov (band) - Netherlands
Raskolnikov (swiss band) - Switzerland
Raskolnikow (film), a 1923 German film directed by Robert Wiene
Raskolnikoff, a tragedy by Leo Birinski
Raskolnikoff, an opera by Heinrich Sutermeister
Raskolnikoff, Overture-fantasy No. 1, by Emil von Reznicek

Other
Raskolnikov (surname)